Jay Donnelly (born 10 April 1995) is an Irish footballer who plays for Glentoran in the NIFL Premiership. He previously played for Cliftonville and had a short spell at Belfast Celtic.

Club career

Cliftonville
Donnelly netted 15 goals over his first two seasons playing for the first team squad, and was part of the sides that won the League Cup during the 2014–15 and 2015–16 seasons. He became a prolific goalscorer for the Reds, and scored 20 goals in the NIFL Premiership during the 2017–18 season. His brother Rory was his teammate.

Prison sentence
In January 2019, Donnelly was given a four-month prison sentence for sharing an indecent image of a child. He initially sent the photo in 2016 of him having consensual sex with a 16-year-old girl to a friend and Cliftonville teammates on a WhatsApp group, but the photo began to spread around the internet. The girl was subjected to taunts due to the image, and relationships with friends were affected. He had admitted to the charge in November 2018 and was dropped by Cliftonville before their match against Dungannon Swifts the same week. On 9 April 2019, Donnelly's sentence was reduced to three months.

Cliftonville announced the termination of Donnelly's contract on 11 April 2019.

Stint with Belfast Celtic and return to Irish League

In January 2020, after becoming eligible to play again, Donnelly signed for Ballymena Intermediate League side Belfast Celtic (not to be confused with the original Belfast Celtic). Belfast Celtic's joint managers defended the decision to sign Donnelly, stating that they "believe in second chances". He scored nine goals in six games.

In September 2020, NIFL Premiership side Glentoran controversially announced the signing of Donnelly. Glentoran defended their decision to sign Donnelly on their website in the transfer announcement, stating that "Glentoran Football club believes that everyone deserves a chance to put mistakes behind them and Jay Donnelly is no different. The club acknowledges that he has both paid and atoned for his past mistakes and deserves the opportunity to rebuild his life and football career. We look forward to him making a positive contribution to the club, and to giving our supporters further reason to see the coming season as one of great opportunity for Glentoran." Former NI international and Premier League footballer Gareth McAuley criticised the move, and compared it to the case of Adam Johnson.

Since moving to the Glens, Donnelly has enjoyed prolific goal scoring, scoring 17 goals in his first season back in the Irish Premiership. He finished top scorer in the 2021–22 season, with 26 goals. His brother Rory also plays for Glentoran.

Honours
Cliftonville
County Antrim Shield: 2014–15
Northern Ireland League Cup: 2014–15, 2015–16

References

1995 births
Living people
People from Belfast
Association footballers from Northern Ireland
Association football forwards
Cliftonville F.C. players
Glentoran F.C. players
NIFL Premiership players
Sportspeople convicted of crimes